Gabriel Vochin (born 26 December 1973) is a Romanian former professional football player.

External links

1973 births
Living people
Romanian footballers
Romanian expatriate footballers
Association football central defenders
FCV Farul Constanța players
FC U Craiova 1948 players
AFC Rocar București players
FC Progresul București players
CSM Ceahlăul Piatra Neamț players
FC Sportul Studențesc București players
Fehérvár FC players
Hapoel Nof HaGalil F.C. players
Hapoel Be'er Sheva F.C. players
Maccabi Ahi Nazareth F.C. players
Nemzeti Bajnokság I players
Expatriate footballers in Hungary
Expatriate footballers in Israel
Romanian expatriate sportspeople in Hungary
Romanian expatriate sportspeople in Israel
Association football defenders
Romania international footballers